The Tesco bomb campaign was an attempted extortion against British supermarket chain Tesco which started in Bournemouth, England, in August 2000 and led to one of the largest and most secretive operations ever undertaken by Dorset Police. During the campaign, a blackmailer identified by the pseudonym "Sally" sent letters to Tesco stores threatening to harm customers if his demands—for Clubcards, modified so that the holder could withdraw cash from ATMs—were not met.

Several months after the threat first came to light, "Sally" sent out several letter bombs, one of which was received and exploded in the face of the householder, causing her shock and minor injuries, while the Royal Mail intercepted several other packages, which had been held up because insufficient stamps had been put on them. In October 2000, "Sally" threatened to use pipe bombs against Tesco customers and the threat was taken seriously enough that Tesco began the production of the modified Clubcards, but were unable to produce the required number before the deadline set by the blackmailer. In November, "Sally" claimed to have placed a pipe bomb in a garden in the Ferndown area of Dorset. No bomb was found.

Police eventually mounted a surveillance operation on the postbox to which several of the extortion letters had been traced and identified "Sally" as Robert Edward Dyer. Dyer was arrested in February 2001, over six months since the beginning of the extortion attempt, and charged with several offences, including nine counts of blackmail and one of common assault, of which he was found guilty in May 2001. He was sentenced to 16 years' imprisonment on 12 June 2001, later reduced to 12 years on appeal. A number of similar extortion attempts against supermarket chains and other businesses and subsequent attacks on Tesco have since been compared to Dyer's campaign by the media.

Beginnings
The campaign began in August 2000, when John Purnell, director of security for Tesco, the United Kingdom's largest supermarket chain, was telephoned by a newsagent in Bournemouth who had discovered a copy of an extortion letter left on his shop's photocopier. The letter demanded that Tesco give away Clubcards, modified for use in cash machines, in the Bournemouth Daily Echo. Over the following days, Dorset Police received two other letters, threatening to send bombs to Tesco customers if the demands were not met.

Investigation
The police investigation into the campaign, codenamed Operation Hornbill, was one of the most secretive ever undertaken by Dorset Police and one of the largest in British policing history. After receiving the second letter, which had been damaged by fire, police made enquiries with the Royal Mail and discovered that a fire had been reported in a postbox on Bradpole Road, Bournemouth, leading to speculation that "Sally"—the alias by which all the letters were signed—had changed his mind and attempted to destroy the letter. They received a third letter on 29 August 2000, in which "Sally" claimed to have prepared letter bombs to send to Tesco's customers.

After receiving the third letter, the police attempted to communicate with "Sally" by covertly taking out a classified advert in the Bournemouth Daily Echo to buy more time. After receiving no response in three weeks, the senior investigating officer, Detective Superintendent Phil James, convened a meeting with other senior officers from across the United Kingdom to assess the threat posed.

Bombings

During James' meeting, he was informed that a letter bomb had exploded in a suburb of Bournemouth. In a documentary about the investigation in 2009, James said "There was a knock at the door and I was told by one of my officers that an incendiary device had just gone off. The atmosphere of the meeting changed. Clearly there was a risk and the threat was very real." Jean Evans, the woman who opened the letter bomb, was taken to hospital with minor injuries, and a bomb disposal team from the British Army was dispatched to the scene. The device had used a party popper to detonate gunpowder inside the envelope. Immediately after the first letter bomb, Dorset Police alerted Royal Mail to look out for similar packages and several were found in a sorting office, having been delayed because insufficient stamps had been placed on them, and defused by the Army. A further seven of the packages were delivered to the homes of Tesco customers. Following the spate of letter bombs, the Army's bomb disposal team was stationed in Bournemouth—something that only usually happens when political party conferences are held in the town—and placed on stand-by.

Another threatening letter was sent in October, threatening to attack Tesco customers with pipe bombs if the demands were not met. The letter contained a cipher which allowed the police to communicate with "Sally" in code through cryptic adverts in the Bournemouth Daily Echo. James contacted the editor of the Echo and the police were allowed to place the messages in the Echo, disguised as Mensa puzzles and made to look like word searches. By this time, the police had narrowed the focus of their investigation on a square-mile area of Bournemouth and James became convinced that they would find "Sally" through the postbox on Bradpole Road, through which the fire-damaged letter had passed in August. The box was placed under surveillance and, eventually, the October letter was traced back to that box. The footage from the surveillance operation was reviewed, but the image was of poor quality.

In November 2000, "Sally" lost patience and sent a letter in which he said he would place a pipe bomb in the garden of a Tesco customer if his demands were not met, prompting the police to seriously consider producing the modified Clubcards. They discovered that they could not produce sufficient cards by 12 December, the deadline "Sally" had set. Approximately 100,000 Clubcards, modified for use in ATMs, were eventually produced, but none were distributed. At the end of November, "Sally" sent another letter, telling the police that he had planted a bomb in a garden in the Ferndown area, giving a grid reference which included over 500 houses. The claim prompted the mobilisation of hundreds of police officers to the area, but no bomb was found.

Arrest
The police received another letter from "Sally" on 7 December. Once again, the letter was traced back to the Bradpole Road postbox, where the surveillance operation had continued. The operation had captured good-quality footage of all the users of the postbox that day, but, as it was close to Christmas, the postbox was busier than normal, with 172 items posted by 38 people. Royal Mail regulations meant that detectives could not open or delay the letters, so they made enquiries with the recipients to identify the senders. They eventually managed to identify all but a small number of the senders.

On 17 February 2001, over six months after the receipt of the first demand and three months since the last letter from "Sally", the police made a major breakthrough. Detective Constable Alan Swanton, a junior detective on the case, spotted one of the people caught by the surveillance of the postbox who had yet to be identified. The man was carrying a fuel container, which Swanton believed had come from a nearby filling station. Officers obtained CCTV footage from the filling station, where their suspect had paid by cheque, and identified the man as Robert Edward Dyer.

Dyer, who, at the time, was a 51-year-old widower and unsuccessful businessman living with his two teenage daughters, was placed under surveillance. The surveillance operation did not yield any results, so the police decided to confront Dyer and visited him at his home on 19 February, where they found an extortion note on his computer and cryptic notes in his handwriting. Dyer was arrested and interviewed. The police later intercepted the final letter from "Sally", which surveillance footage showed Dyer posting the day before he was arrested and which was an exact match to the letter found on Dyer's computer. Detective Superintendent James later revealed that Dyer "was an individual in desperate need of money and believing that Tesco was the answer to all his problems."

Conviction
Dyer was charged and, in May 2001, pleaded guilty on nine counts of blackmail, as well as a sole count of common assault against Jean Evans, the woman who opened the letter bomb. On 11 June 2001, he was sentenced to 16 years' imprisonment by a judge at Dorchester Crown Court. The sentence was reduced to 12 years' imprisonment on appeal and Dyer was released from prison in 2007.

During the trial, it emerged that Dyer had worn gloves to avoid leaving fingerprints on the letters and used water to stick the stamps rather than licking them, but that he had made errors, such as leaving a copy of an extortion demand on a newsagent's photocopier; however, there is speculation that this was done so his letter would reach Tesco by a person other than himself. Although Dyer initially demanded only £200,000, Tesco would have lost an estimated £5 million had they complied with Dyer's demand to place cards in every copy of the Bournemouth Echo.

Aftermath
The investigation was one of the largest and most secretive that had ever been undertaken by Dorset Police. Dyer got inspiration for the campaign from an article he read about disgraced former London Metropolitan Police detective Rodney Whitchelo, who attempted to extort £4 million from H. J. Heinz Company by spiking jars of baby food. Whitchelo was sentenced to 17 years' imprisonment in 1990 but was released in 1999. Dyer's campaign was also compared to that of Edgar Pearce, dubbed the "Mardi Gras bomber" by the media. Over three years, Pearce had used bombs in an attempt to extort money from Barclays Bank and Sainsbury's supermarkets. He was sentenced to 21 years' imprisonment in 1999. Later incidents have also been compared to Dyer's campaign, including another against Tesco in 2007.

An episode of the crime documentary series Real Crime was made about the campaign in 2009 and broadcast by ITV. The documentary featured interviews with Neal Butterworth, then-editor of the Bournemouth Daily Echo and DSI James, the police officer who led the investigation.

See also
Tesco blackmail plot
2007 Tesco blackmail campaign

References

2000 crimes in the United Kingdom
History of Bournemouth
Crime in Dorset
Extortion
Tesco
Attacks on supermarkets
2000s in England
Building bombings in England
Extortion attempts against Tesco